Michurina is the name of several rural localities in Russia:

Modern localities
Michurina, Republic of Adygea, a settlement in Maykopsky District of the Republic of Adygea; 
Michurina, Chechen Republic, a settlement in Goyskaya Rural Administration of Urus-Martanovsky District in the Chechen Republic
Michurina, Tambov Oblast, a settlement in Izosimovsky Selsoviet of Michurinsky District in Tambov Oblast
Michurina, Aleksinsky District, Tula Oblast, a settlement in Michurinsky Rural Okrug of Aleksinsky District in Tula Oblast
Michurina, Yefremovsky District, Tula Oblast, a settlement in Yasenovsky Rural Okrug of Yefremovsky District in Tula Oblast

Alternative names
Michurina, alternative name of Michurino, a village in Nadvinsky Rural Administrative Okrug of Kletnyansky District in Bryansk Oblast;

See also
imeni Michurina